The Chinese Ambassador to Samoa is the official representative of the People's Republic of China to the Independent State of Samoa.

List of representatives

See also
China–Samoa relations

References 

 
Samoa
China